Viggo Jarl (28 November 1879 – 23 March 1965) was a Danish sculptor. His work was part of the sculpture event in the art competition at the 1928 Summer Olympics.

References

1879 births
1965 deaths
20th-century Danish sculptors
Male sculptors
Olympic competitors in art competitions
People from Copenhagen
Danish male artists
20th-century Danish male artists